The 1906 Georgia Bulldogs football team represented the Georgia Bulldogs of the University of Georgia during the 1906 Southern Intercollegiate Athletic Association football season. The Bulldogs completed the season with a 2–4–1 record. Georgia’s only victories in the 1906 season came against Mercer and Auburn. The season included Georgia's third straight loss to Georgia Tech and the seventh straight loss to Clemson.   During the 1906 season, the forward pass was legalized and the team tried to use this new play, however, an errant pass contributed to the loss to Davidson. This was the Georgia Bulldogs' first season under the guidance of head coach Bull Whitney.

Schedule

References

Georgia
Georgia Bulldogs football seasons
Georgia Bulldogs football